The South Carolina Army National Guard is a component of the United States Army and the United States National Guard.  Nationwide, the Army National Guard comprises approximately one half of the U.S. Army's available combat forces and approximately one third of its support organization.  National coordination of various state National Guard units is maintained through the National Guard Bureau.

South Carolina Army National Guard units are trained and equipped as part of the United States Army.  The same ranks and insignia are used and National Guardsmen are eligible to receive all United States military awards. The South Carolina Guard also bestows a number of state awards for local services rendered in or to the state of South Carolina.

The South Carolina Army National Guard is composed of approximately 10,000 Soldiers (as of February, 2009), and maintains 80 facilities across the state with over 2 million square feet (180,000 m2) of space.

Units and formations
Army National Guard Element, JFHQ-SC  
 263rd Army and Air Missile Defense Command (263rd AAMDC), Anderson
 Headquarters and Headquarters Battery (HHB), Anderson
 678th Air Defense Artillery Brigade (678th ADAB), Eastover
 2nd Battalion, 263rd Air Defense Artillery Regiment (2-263rd ADAR), Anderson
 HHB, Anderson
 Battery A, Seneca
 Battery B, Easley
 Battery C, Clemson
 Battery D, Clemson
1st Battalion, 178th Field Artillery Regiment (1-178th FA), Georgetown
HHB, Georgetown
Battery A, Andrews
Battery B, Clinton
Battery C, Manning
FSC, Hemingway
 218th Maneuver Enhancement Brigade (218th MEB), Charleston
 Headquarters and Headquarters Company (HHC), Charleston
 1st Battalion, 118th Infantry Regiment, Mullins
 HHC, Mullins
 Company A, Moncks Corner
 Company B, North Charleston
 Company C, Mount Pleasant
 Company D, Marion
 1118th Forward Support Company (1118th FSC), Summerville
 4th Battalion, 118th Infantry Regiment, Union. (30th ABCT)
 HHC, Union.
 Company A, Conway.
 Company B, Gaffney.
 Company C, Fountain Inn.
 Hotel Company, Greer. (formerly 1263rd FSC)
218th Brigade Support Battalion (218th BSB), Varnville, SC
 111th Signal Company, North Charleston
108th Chemical Company, North Charleston.
 228th Signal Brigade, Spartanburg
 HHC, Spartanburg
 151st Signal Battalion, Greenville
 HHC, Greenville
 Company A, Greenwood
 Company B, Hodges
 Company C, Camden
 Company B, 198th Signal Battalion
 117th Engineer Brigade, Newberry
 122nd Engineer Battalion, Edgefield
 HHC, Edgefield
 Forward Support Company, Edgefield
 124th Engineer Company (Horizontal Construction), Saluda
 125th Engineer Company, Abbeville
 1221st Engineer Company (Clearance), Graniteville
 1225th Engineer Detachment (Survey & Design), Batesburg
 1226th Engineer Detachment (Asphalt), Batesburg
 1227th Engineer Detachment (Concrete), Batesburg
 710th Explosive Hazardous Coordination Cell
 178th Engineer Battalion, Rock Hill
 HHC, Rock Hill
 Forward Support Company, Rock Hill
 174th Engineer Company, Wellford
 1223rd Engineer Company (Vertical Construction), Walterboro
 1782nd Engineer Company, Lancaster
 1222nd Engineer Company (Sapper), Fort Mill
59th Troop Command, West Columbia
 51st Military Police Battalion (51st MPB), Florence
Headquarters and Headquarters Detachment (HHD), Florence
132nd Military Police Company (132nd MPC) (Combat Support), West Columbia
133rd Military Police Company (133rd MPC) (Combat Support), Timmonsville
 751st Combat Sustainment Support Battalion (751st CSSB), Newberry
 HHC, Newberry
 741st Quartermaster Company (Water Purification), Barnwell
 742nd Ordnance Company, Eastover
 264th Engineer Detachment (Firefighting Headquarters), Eastover
 3442nd Maintenance Company, Orangeburg
 1050th Transportation Battalion, Newberry
 Headquarters and Headquarters Detachment (HHD), Newberry
 1052nd Transportation Company (Cargo), Kingstree
 1053rd Transportation Company (Light/Medium Truck), Bennettsville
 1055th Transportation Company (Cargo), Laurens
 59th Aviation Troop Command (59th ATC), McEntire JNGB
1st Battalion (General Support), 111th Aviation Regiment
 Company A (UH-60)
 1st Battalion (Attack Reconnaissance), 151st Aviation Regiment
 HHC
 Company A (UH-60)
 Company B
 Company C (AH-64E)
 Company D (AVUM)
 Company E (Forward Support)
 2nd Battalion, 151st Aviation Regiment
 HHC
 Company A at Army Aviation Support Facility Donaldson Field, Greenville (UH-72)
 351st Aviation Support Battalion (351st ASB), Sumter
 2nd Battalion (General Support) Battalion, 238th Aviation Regiment at Army Aviation Support Facility Donaldson Field, Greenville
 Company B (CH-47D/F)
 Detachment 1
 43rd Civil Support Team (43rd CST), West Columbia
 1051st Judge Advocate General Detachment (1051st JAGD), Columbia
 Detachment 24, OSACOM
 108th Public Affairs Detachment (108th MPAD)
 246th Army Band
 251st Medical Company
 218th Regiment (Leadership)
 1st Battalion
 2nd Battalion: OCS
 3rd Battalion
 4th Battalion
 5th Battalion

Duties
National Guard units can be mobilized at any time by presidential order to supplement regular armed forces, and upon declaration of a state of emergency by the governor of the state in which they serve. Unlike Army Reserve members, National Guard members cannot be mobilized individually (except through voluntary transfers and Temporary DutY Assignments, TDY), but only as part of their respective units.

Active duty callups
For much of the final decades of the twentieth century, National Guard personnel typically served "One weekend a month, two weeks a year", with a portion working for the Guard in a full-time capacity.  The current forces formation plans of the US Army call for the typical National Guard unit (or National Guardsman) to serve one year of active duty for every three years of service.  More specifically, current Department of Defense policy is that no Guardsman will be involuntarily activated for a total of more than 24 months (cumulative) in one six-year enlistment period (this policy was due to change 1 August 2007; the new policy states that soldiers will be given 24 months between deployments of no more than 24 months; individual states have differing policies).

History

The South Carolina Army National Guard was originally formed in 1670.  The Militia Act of 1903 organized the various state militias into the present National Guard system.

The South Carolina National Guard's militia predecessors saw action in the Revolutionary War, War of 1812, Mexican War, American Civil War, and the Spanish–American War.

South Carolina's National Guard first served in their National Guard capacity on the Mexican Border during the Punitive Expedition of 1916–1917. With the United States entry into the First World War, the SCNG was federalized and several key units were composed of National Guard troops from the state. The 118th Infantry of the 30th Division and the 117th Engineers, along with the 105th Ammunition Train, 105th Sanitary Train, 30th Division Sanitary Detachment, and HQ Company of the 30th Division.

The 118th Infantry (formerly the 1st SC Infantry) formed one of the four infantry regiments that made up the 30th Division. The 30th trained at Camp Sevier outside Greenville, SC and was sent to France. The 118th, along with the rest of the division (minus the division's artillery regiment) fought under British Expeditionary Force command. The 30th alongside the 27th Division (the federalized NY National Guard) formed 2nd Corps. After further training with the British, the 30th Division was sent to Kemmel, Belgium (just south of Ypres), where the 118th got their first time in the trenches. Although relatively quiet, the 118th was able to learn a great deal from this experience. In preparation for the last great Allied Offensive, the division trained alongside tanks prior to being moved to the edge of the German Hindenburg Line. On 29 September, the 118th infantry in reserve supported the breaking of the Hindenburg Line by other units of the 30th Division near the French village of Bellicourt. Following this success, the division continued to fight a retreating, but not defeated German Army. They suffered heavy casualties to German artillery, gas, and machine gun fire. The 118th fought until 19 October, not seeing combat again prior to the Armistice. The 118th had six Medal of Honor recipients (two posthumous) in their ranks to include future SCNG Adjutant General James Dozier. Many more men of the regiment were awarded Distinguished Service Crosses and foreign awards for valor.

The first battalion of the 117th Engineers were formed as part of the 42nd Infantry Division. They were joined with men from the California National Guard to create the 117th Engineers. The 42nd, known as the Rainbow Division, earned its name due to the efforts made to create a unit that encompassed men from around the country. The 117th Engineers were tasked with road construction, road repair, construction of shelters, construction and repair of trenches, wiring and cutting of barbed wire, establishing assault paths, and clearing of obstacles. They performed all of these duties in addition to standing in as infantry in several circumstances and policing the battlefield of human remains. They participated in four campaigns: the Champagne Marne, the Aisne Marne, the Saint Mihiel Offensive, and the Meuse Argonne. The 117th served with the 42nd Division through the Armistice.

The 118th Infantry was reactivated in World War Two. The regiment became a Separate Infantry Regiment as the Army restructured with only three, not four regiments making up an infantry division. For that reason, the 118th was not part of the 30th Division like they had been during the First World War. The 118th regiment was first deployed to Iceland. Their purpose was to defend the island nation and Allied assets, from the threat of German invasion. The 118th was eventually sent to England where individual companies served as cadre to train replacements and zero weapons. Elements of the 2nd Battalion protected bridges during the Battle of the Bulge.

South Carolina aviation troops and their AH-64 Apache attack helicopters were called to Kuwait as part of Operation Southern Watch between August 1999 and February 2000. As Task Force 151, commanded by LTC David Anderson, the Task Force was augmented by Mississippi and Minnesota Army National Guard units, along with individual personnel from the National Guards of New Hampshire, Arizona, and Washington state.

South Carolina's C Company, 1-151st Aviation was deployed to Kosovo under operational control of 1-104 AVN of the Pennsylvania ARNG (as were National Guard aviation units from Alabama and Nebraska) during KFOR 5A operations from July 2003 to February 2004.

Headquarters and Headquarters Company (HHC),along with A, B, D, and L Companies of the 1-151st Aviation were deployed as Task Force 1-151st Aviation during Operation Iraqi Freedom II & III from October 2004 to October 2005, where they gained fame flying their AH-64A Apaches in an experimental two-tone grey scheme in support of the 1st Stryker Brigade, 25th Infantry Division (Light), and then supported operations of the II Marine Expeditionary Force (II MEF) in Al-Anbar Province. Task Force 1-151 was augmented with National Guard personnel from Tennessee, Missouri, and Maryland and the Individual Ready Reserve of the Army.  L Company, 1-151 was augmented with National Guard personnel from Idaho, Iowa, Kentucky, Ohio, and Wyoming, serving with distinction during OIF.

In the fall of 2008, a CH-47D Detachment, B Company, 2-238th Aviation was activated in support of OEF, and deployed to Afghanistan. Paired with Illinois National Guard, B Company was split between three different forward operating bases, Bagram, Kandahar/Shank, and Salerno, with each acting independently of the others. The detachment's main missions included resupply, troop movement, and air assaults on high-value targets. B Company, 2-238th Aviation returned home in fall of 2009 after serving with great distinction and perseverance during Operation Enduring Freedom II.

Historic units
  118th Infantry Regiment
  218th Infantry Regiment
  263rd Armor Regiment
  202nd Cavalry Regiment
  178th Field Artillery Regiment (178th FAR)
  151st Aviation Regiment
  263rd Air Defense Artillery Brigade (263rd ADAB)

See also
169th Fighter Wing
Combat Aviation Brigade, 36th Infantry Division - approx. 15 SC ARNG soldiers deployed to Iraq in Sep 2006.
 South Carolina Naval Militia
 South Carolina State Guard

References

External links
Bibliography of South Carolina Army National Guard History compiled by the United States Army Center of Military History
South Carolina Army National Guard, accessed 26 Nov 2006
GlobalSecurity.org South Carolina Army National Guard, accessed 26 Nov 2006

United States Army National Guard by state
Military in South Carolina